Jacob Cauthen Westbrook (born September 29, 1977) is an American former professional baseball pitcher in Major League Baseball. He was known as a sinker ball pitcher and hit a grand slam as a batter. During his career, Westbrook played for the New York Yankees, Cleveland Indians and St. Louis Cardinals. He was selected to one All-Star game and won a World Series championship with the Cardinals in 2011 over the Texas Rangers.

Early and personal life
Westbrook was born on September 29, 1977, in Athens, Georgia. His father, Cauthen, played baseball and basketball at the University of Georgia, where Jake signed a letter of intent (but never attended because he signed with the Colorado Rockies). He has an older sister, Jill.

Westbrook attended Madison County High School. He tossed five no-hitters and one perfect game in his high school career. During his senior season, Westbrook was 9–1 with a 1.11 ERA and 110 strikeouts in 63 innings. On March 28, 2008, Westbrook appeared at his high school alma mater to speak and give thanks as they retired his high school #12 jersey during a home baseball game.

Westbrook married his high school sweetheart, Heather Daniels, on December 12, 1998. The couple has two sons and a daughter. They reside in Danielsville, Georgia. and have a home in Germantown, Tennessee.

Professional career

Draft and minor leagues
Westbrook was a first round draft pick (21st overall) in the 1996 Major League first-year player draft by the Colorado Rockies. He had previously committed to play college baseball for the Georgia Bulldogs. Following the draft, 18-year-old Westbrook began his pro career with the Arizona Rockies, the Rookie league affiliate of the Rockies in the Arizona League. He pitched in 11 games in Mesa, before moving up to the Class A-Short Season Portland Rockies in the Northwest League.

For the 1997 season, Westbrook was promoted to the Class A Asheville Tourists in the South Atlantic League. He went 14–11 with a 4.29 ERA in 27 starts.

On November 18, 1997, the day after the 1997 Major League Baseball expansion draft, the Rockies traded Westbrook along with fellow minor leaguers John Nicholson and Mark Hamlin to the Montreal Expos for infielder Mike Lansing. The Expos assigned Westbrook to the Jupiter Hammerheads, their Class A-Advanced affiliate in the Florida State League. In 1998, he went 11–6 for the Hammerheads with a 3.26 ERA in 27 starts. In 1999, he went 11–5 with a 3.92 ERA in 27 starts for the Harrisburg Senators, the Double-A club in the Eastern League.

Following three consecutive 27 start seasons, Westbrook was traded in the off-season. On December 22, 1999, the Expos traded him with two players to be named later to the New York Yankees for Hideki Irabu. (Montreal Expos eventually sent Ted Lilly (March 17, 2000) and Christian Parker (March 22, 2000) to the Yankees to complete the trade.) 

The Yankees assigned Westbrook to the Triple-A Columbus Clippers in the International League. He went 5–7 with a 4.65 ERA in 15 starts.

New York Yankees (2000)
Westbrook made his spring debut and allowed 3 runs in 3 innings, still Joe Torre was pleased with what he had seen from the 22-year-old Westbrook.

In his major league debut on June 17, 2000, and his first start at Yankee Stadium for the Yankees against the Chicago White Sox, he did not make it past the second inning. He appeared in three games for the Yankees as a rookie, two starts and once out of the bullpen, going 0–2 with a 13.50 ERA.

Cleveland Indians (2000–2010)

On June 29, 2000, the Yankees traded Westbrook with fellow sinker ball pitcher Zach Day and outfielder Ricky Ledée to the Cleveland Indians for outfielder/designated hitter David Justice in their quest to eventually win the 2000 World Series. However, Westbrook cracked a rib at some point while he was pitching, so his 2000 season was cut short.

In 2001, the Indians invited him to spring training. He shuttled back and forth between Cleveland and Triple-A Buffalo Bisons in the International League. He did well in Buffalo, amassing an 8–1 record in 12 starts. But he struggled with his role, going a lackluster 4–4 in Cleveland out of the bullpen and in six spot starts.

In 2002, Westbrook caught a break. He became a regular part of the Cleveland pitching staff that was in transition, as the Tribe went 74–88, finishing 3rd in American League Central Division and getting coach Charlie Manuel sacked midway through the season (76 games). He also signed a three-year contract with the team. For the 2003 season, Westbrook converted back to starter, going 7–10 with a 4.33 ERA, ending the year as the team's fourth starter.

After beginning the season in the Indians bullpen, Westbrook earned a spot in the Indians rotation in late May.

After becoming a full-time starter in 2004, the sinkerballer won at least 14 games in three consecutive seasons.

In 2006, he induced more double plays (35) than any other pitcher in the majors.

In April , Westbrook signed a three-year, $33 million contract extension with the Indians, which was intended to keep him in Cleveland through the 2010 season.

After being placed on the 15-day DL in April , Westbrook came back to pitch his first game for the Indians on May 28. After the start, Westbrook began to feel soreness in his elbow, but was optimistic that he would be able to make his next start. On June 7, 2008, the Tribe announced that he would be undergoing Tommy John surgery and be out of action for 10–14 months, ending his 2008 season. Westbrook also spent the entire 2009 season on the 60-day DL, still recovering from the surgery.

He pitched in 4 games of winter ball in Puerto Rico during the end of the 2009 season, testing his surgically repaired elbow before the 2010 season.

He returned to action as the Indians' 2010 Opening Day starter. Through 21 starts, he was 6-7 with 1 complete game.

St. Louis Cardinals (2010–2013)
On July 31, 2010, Westbrook was part of a three-team trade involving the Indians, St. Louis Cardinals, and San Diego Padres. He went to the Cardinals along with Class A left-hand pitcher Nick Greenwood and cash, while the Tribe received Double-A right-handed pitcher Corey Kluber from San Diego. The Padres got outfielder Ryan Ludwick. Westbrook, who had nearly $4 million remaining in his 2010 salary and another $2 million bonus because of the trade, agreed to forgo part of the bonus to make the deal happen. He was 6–7 with a 4.65 ERA in 21 starts with the Indians prior to the trade.

Between Cleveland and St. Louis, Westbrook finished 10–11 with a 4.22 ERA in 33 starts. He went 4–4 with St.Louis following the trade.

On November 16, 2010, Westbrook and the St. Louis Cardinals agreed to a two-year $16.5 million deal with a mutual 2013 option and a blanket no-trade clause. On August 31, 2011, Westbrook hit his first career home run, a grand slam against the Milwaukee Brewers.

In 2011, although he had a 12–9 record, Westbrook sported a 4.66 ERA while issuing a career high 73 walks in 183.1 innings.

Westbrook was initially left off the Cardinals' 2011 playoff roster. However, after the Cardinals' bullpen faced a heavy load in the National League Division Series and the National League Championship Series, Westbrook was added to the World Series Roster. Westbrook pitched in two games and recorded a win in the pivotal game six, when the Cardinals came from behind to win in extra innings while facing elimination.

Westbrook improved upon his 2011 performance by recording 13 wins before suffering an injury that kept him out of the last month of the season and missing the 2012 playoffs. He finished the 2012 season with a 13-11 record and a 3.97 ERA, his first season since 2004 with an ERA under 4.00 in a full season.

On July 24, 2013, Westbrook won his seventh game of the season, pitching seven innings while going 3–3 with a walk and a stolen base.

On October 31, 2013, the Cardinals declined their $9.5 million option on Westbrook for the 2014 season, making him a free agent. Hampered by injuries after the All-Star break, Westbrook saw little action in the last months of the season and was left off the Cardinals post-season roster. Westbrook finished his Cardinal career with a 36-32 win / loss record and a 4.27 ERA over three seasons.

On February 14, 2014, he announced his retirement from baseball.

Pitching style
Westbrook was a sinkerballer, the pitch accounting for more than 60% of his total pitches. It sat in the low 90s, averaging about 91 mph. He also threw a slider/cutter in the mid-high 80s, as well as a changeup and curveball around 80 mph. Westbrook used his slider on both left- and right-handed hitters, but threw the curveball only to righties and the changeup only to lefties.

In 2013, Westbrook added a split finger to his arsenal.

References

External links

Westbrook player profile page at Scout.com

1977 births
Living people
Major League Baseball pitchers
Sportspeople from Athens, Georgia
Baseball players from Georgia (U.S. state)
New York Yankees players
Cleveland Indians players
St. Louis Cardinals players
Arizona League Rockies players
Asheville Tourists players
Jupiter Hammerheads players
Harrisburg Senators players
Columbus Clippers players
Buffalo Bisons (minor league) players
Akron Aeros players
Portland Rockies players
Lake County Captains players
Springfield Cardinals players
Peoria Chiefs players